K. Waterschei S.V. Thor Genk was a Belgian football club from the city of Genk, Limburg (Belgium).

It was created in 1919 as Waterschei's Sport Vereeniging Thor with Thor being the acronym of Tot Herstel Onzer Rechten ("To recover our rights"), later changed to Tot Heil Onzer Ribbenkas(t) ("For The Benefit Of Our Rib Cage").  It registered to the FA only in 1925 and received the matricule n°533.  The club enjoyed a spell in the first division in the late 1950s to the early 1960s and again from 1978 to 1986.  After two seasons in the second division, K. Waterschei S.V. Thor Genk merged with K.F.C. Winterslag to form K.R.C. Genk.

During the season 1982–83, the match between Standard Liège and Waterschei  and Standard Liège eventually won the championship. 

Waterschei won the Belgian Cup twice (1980 and 1982). The latter victory led to Waterschei unexpectedly reaching the semi-finals of the European Cup Winners Cup in 1982–83. After defeating PSG in the quarter-finals, Waterschei lost the first leg of the semi-final 5–1 at Pittodrie, home of the eventual winners, Aberdeen.  A 1–0 victory in Genk, courtesy of Eddy Voordeckers, could not reverse the position.

Notable players were among others Lei Clijsters (international, and father of former tennis star Kim Clijsters), keeper Klaus Pudelko, striker Heinz Gründel, Icelandic striker Larus Gudmundsson, midfielder Pier(re) Janssen and Dutch defender and international Adrie Van Kraaij.

Honours
Belgian Cup
Winners: 1979–80, 1981–82
Runners-up: 1954–55

See also
:Category:K. Waterschei S.V. Thor Genk players

References
 Belgian football clubs history
 RSSSF Archive – 1st and 2nd division final tables
 THOR WATERSCHEI Football-Blog (German)

Association football clubs established in 1919
Defunct football clubs in Belgium
Association football clubs disestablished in 1988
1919 establishments in Belgium
1988 disestablishments in Belgium

Organisations based in Belgium with royal patronage
Belgian Pro League clubs
K. Waterschei S.V. Thor Genk
K.R.C. Genk
Sport in Limburg (Belgium)